The W. Martyn grocers shop is a grade II listed building at 135 Queens Parade, Muswell Hill Broadway, London.

Queens Parade was built in 1897 by James Edmundson. The shop front dates from the 1930s. It was designated as a listed building with Historic England in 2009 as a "rare example of a late-Victorian or Edwardian grocery shop interior with matchboard panelling, mahogany shelving and counter and metal storage bins with mahogany lids".

Gallery

References

External links

Grade II listed buildings in the London Borough of Haringey
Muswell Hill